Yrma Lydya Gamboa Jiménez (17 September 1999 – 23 June 2022) was a Mexican singer who specialised in bolero music.

Career 
Lydya was recognised for her music by the Mexican Congress in 2019.

Death 
She was murdered in June 2022. Her husband was charged with her femicide, and he was found dead in October 2022.

References 

1999 births
2022 deaths
Femicide in Mexico
Singers from Mexico City
21st-century Mexican women singers
2022 murders in Mexico
Bolero singers
Deaths by firearm in Mexico